Karolj Kopas (born 21 July 1958) is a Yugoslav wrestler. He competed in the men's Greco-Roman 90 kg at the 1984 Summer Olympics.

References

1958 births
Living people
Yugoslav male sport wrestlers
Olympic wrestlers of Yugoslavia
Wrestlers at the 1984 Summer Olympics
Place of birth missing (living people)